Play (stylized in all caps) is the debut studio album by South Korean brother-sister duo, AKMU, and their first release since winning K-pop Star 2 in 2012. It was released through YG Entertainment on April 7, 2014.

Background
On March 31, 2014, YG Entertainment revealed the first teaser picture. On April 1, the second teaser picture was revealed, followed by the album's track list on April 2.

Composition
Lee Chan-hyuk produced and wrote all the songs on the Play album. YG Entertainment's CEO Yang Hyun-suk explained, "Up to now, I was in charge of producing albums for many singers. However, Akdong Musician's was the hardest for me.  The musical genres I had mainly worked with were hip hop and R&B.  However, Akdong Musician's genre is folk.  It was a genre I have never tried before, so it was only right that they did it themselves. The two members of Akdong Musician debuted at an extremely young age. This year, Chan-hyuk will be 18 and Su-hyun will be 15. Because they are so young, if I were to order them to do this and that, their purity could get ruined. I decided it might actually be much more effective if the siblings personally [produced] it. As you can see by the results, this was verified after the album came out.

Promotion and release
The album was digitally released on April 7, 2014. The album, consisting of 11 songs, was released worldwide through iTunes, Melon, Genie, and other online music portals. The physical album hit stores on April 9. The group's first stage comeback was on K-pop Star 3 on April 6. "200%" and "Melted" had been chosen directly as the title tracks, and the third title track, "Give Love", was chosen on April 14 after a round of fan voting.

Track listing

Charts

Weekly charts

Year-end charts

Release history

Notes

References

External links
 
 
 
 
 

AKMU albums
2014 debut albums
YG Entertainment albums
Genie Music albums